The following individuals have all been affiliated with the Assyrian Church of the East.

Saint Addai
Saint Mari
Diodorus of Tarsus
Theodore of Mopsuestia
Abu Sahl 'Isa ibn Yahya al-Masihi
Abu Bishr Matta ibn Yunus
Masawaiyh
Nestorius
Babai the Great
Barsauma
Bukhtishu
'Ubayd Allah ibn Bakhtishu
Jabril ibn Bukhtishu
Yuhanna ibn Bukhtishu 
Abraham the Great of Kashkar
Hunayn ibn Ishaq
Henana of Adiabene
Ibn Butlan
Shimun VIII Yohannan Sulaqa
Shimun XXI Eshai
Mar Thoma Darmo
Mar Dinkha IV
Salmawaih ibn Bunan
John bar Penkaye

References 

 
Assyrian Church of the East
Assyrian Church of the East-related lists